Memoirs of a Geisha is a historical fiction novel by American author Arthur Golden, published in 1997. The novel, told in first person perspective, tells the story of Nitta Sayuri and the many trials she faces on the path to becoming and working as a geisha in Kyoto, Japan, before, during and after World War II.

In 2005, a film adaptation was released, directed by Rob Marshall and starring Zhang Ziyi in the lead role.

Plot summary

In 1929, nine year-old Sakamoto Chiyo and her sister are sold by their father to work within the entertainment districts of Kyoto. They are taken from their home in a coastal fishing village known as Yoroido and travel to Kyoto by train. Chiyo is taken to the Nitta  (geisha boarding house) in Gion, but her sister is taken to a brothel within Kyoto's pleasure district.

Chiyo is introduced to Auntie, Mother, and Granny. Both Auntie and Mother are strict, though Auntie is kinder to Chiyo, whereas Mother is driven by money and business. Hatsumomo dislikes Chiyo and goes out of her way to torment her.

A few years later, Chiyo is given money and a handkerchief in the street by a kind stranger known to Chiyo as the Chairman. Mameha, another famous geisha in Gion, persuades a reluctant Mother to reinvest in Chiyo's training, with Mameha acting as Chiyo's mentor and "older sister".

Chiyo becomes an apprentice geisha with the given name of Sayuri, and is reacquainted with Chairman Iwamura, his closest friend and business partner Nobu, and a number of other prominent men. As Sayuri gains popularity, Hatsumomo tries to hurt Sayuri's reputation and career in the hopes of Mother adopting Pumpkin instead.

Mameha orchestrates a bidding war for Sayuri's  and uses the record-breaking payment for Sayuri's  to cover all of her debts.

In 1944, geisha districts are ordered to close, and Sayuri desperately asks Nobu for help to avoid being conscripted into factory work. He sends Sayuri far north to live with his old friend, Arashino, where she stays for much of the war.

At the end of the war, Nobu visits Sayuri, asking that she return to Gion. Sayuri finds Pumpkin working in a new ; despite hoping to rekindle their friendship, Pumpkin later sabotages Sayuri's plan to scare Nobu off from proposing to be her , as revenge for taking her place in the adoption so many years ago.

A few days after her plan fails, Sayuri is summoned to meet the Chairman at a teahouse. She confesses that she has worked for years to become close to the Chairman. The Chairman admits that he has always known she was the girl he met on the street, and confesses his feelings for her as well, but felt he owed Nobu – his oldest and closest friend – the chance to be with Sayuri out of kindness. He also admits to having asked Mameha to train Sayuri.

Sayuri peacefully retires from geisha work when the Chairman becomes her . Sayuri relocates to New York City and opens her own small tea house for entertaining Japanese men on business in the United States. The Chairman remains her  until his death.

References to actual locations
Much of the novel is set in the popular geisha district of Gion in Kyoto, and contains references to actual places frequented by geisha and their patrons, such as the Ichiriki Ochaya. Part of the story is also set in the Amami Islands, and Sayuri narrates the story from her suite in the Waldorf towers in New York City.

Lawsuit
After the Japanese edition of the novel was published, Arthur Golden was sued for breach of contract and defamation of character by Mineko Iwasaki, a retired geisha he had interviewed for background information while writing the novel. The plaintiff asserted that Golden had agreed to protect her anonymity if she told him about her life as a geisha, due to the traditional code of silence about their clients. However, Golden listed Iwasaki as a source in his acknowledgments for the novel, causing her to face a serious backlash, to the point of death threats. In his defense, Arthur Golden countered that he had tapes of his conversations with Iwasaki. Eventually, in 2003, Golden's publisher settled with Iwasaki out of court for an undisclosed sum of money.

Iwasaki later went on to write an autobiography, which shows a very different picture of 20th century geisha life than the one shown in Golden's novel. The book was published as Geisha, A Life in the US and Geisha of Gion in the UK.

Film version

In 2005, film director Rob Marshall made a film version of the novel. It stars two Chinese actresses, Zhang Ziyi as Sayuri and Gong Li as Hatsumomo; Malaysian actress Michelle Yeoh as Mameha; and three Japanese actors, Ken Watanabe as the Chairman, Suzuka Ohgo as Sayuri's childhood incarnation Chiyo, and Youki Kudoh as the adult Pumpkin.

Filming was primarily done in California, and in some locations in Kyoto, including Kiyomizu-dera and Fushimi Inari-taisha. It was nominated for and won numerous awards, including nominations for six Academy Awards, winning three: Best Cinematography, Best Art Direction, and Best Costume Design.

See also

 Geisha
 
 Orientalism

Notes

References

 Dalby, Liza. 1983. "Geisha". pp. 54–64 (prostitution); pp. 109–12 ("deflowering" and mizu-age).
 Golden, Arthur, 1999. Memoirs of a Geisha. G. K. Hall.
Iwasaki, Mineko, 2003.   Geisha; A Life. Simon & Schuster.
 McAlpin, Heller, November 30, 1997. "Night Butterflies; Memoirs of a Geisha". Los Angeles Times, p. 8.

1997 American novels
American historical novels
Novels set in Japan
Alfred A. Knopf books
American novels adapted into films
Novels about Japanese prostitution
Novels about geisha
Works about women in war
1997 debut novels
Japan in non-Japanese culture
Race-related controversies in literature